Muckaloochee Creek is a stream in the U.S. state of Georgia. It is a tributary to Muckalee Creek.

A variant name is "Muckatoochee Creek".

References

Rivers of Georgia (U.S. state)
Rivers of Lee County, Georgia
Rivers of Sumter County, Georgia